Litlesotra, or sometimes Lille Sotra, is an island in Øygarden Municipality in Vestland county, Norway.  It is part of the Sotra island group which makes up the southern part of a larger archipelago of islands from Fedje south through Øygarden.  The  island has about 10,000 residents.  The main settlement on the island is Straume. Other settlements include Knarrevik, Foldnes, and Brattholmen. The island is connected to the mainland via the Sotra Bridge.  It is also connected to the large island of Sotra, via a series of bridges over the island of Bildøy.

The island lies where the Hjeltefjorden meets the Byfjorden.  The island of Bjorøyna lies to the south, the island of Askøy lies to the northeast, the island of Geitung lies to the northwest, and Bildøy and Sotra islands lie to the west.  The Bergen Peninsula on the mainland lies to the east.

See also
List of islands of Norway

References

Islands of Vestland
Øygarden